(+)-T-Muurolol synthase (EC 4.2.3.98) is an enzyme with systematic name (2E,6E)-farnesyl-diphosphate diphosphate-lyase (cyclizing, (+)-T-muurolol-forming). This enzyme catalyses the following chemical reaction

 (2E,6E)-farnesyl diphosphate + H2O  (+)-T-muurolol + diphosphate

The cyclization mechanism involves an intermediate nerolidyl diphosphate.

References

External links 
 

EC 4.2.3